Yonnie or Yonny may refer to:

 Thomas Licavoli (1904-1973), American gangster and bootlegger during Prohibition, nicknamed "Yonnie"
 Joseph Yonnie Starr (1905-1990), Canadian Hall-of-Fame Thoroughbred racehorse trainer
 Yonny Hernández (born 1988), Colombian motorcycle racer
 DJ Yonny (born 1983), American disc jockey born Jonathan Ávila

Lists of people by nickname